Laurence Sematimba (born 28 June 1982) is a Ugandan cricketer. He is a wicketkeeper and has played 9 ICC Trophy games for Uganda.

External links
 

1982 births
Living people
Ugandan cricketers
Cricketers from Kampala
Wicket-keepers